Kramgoa låtar 13 is a 1985 Vikingarna studio album. The album was rereleased to CD in 1988 and 1992.

Track listing
Millioner röda rosor
Aloha Oe Aloha Oe
Pendlaren Putte
Vår egen melodi 
I Know Why Sun Valley Serenade
Näckens dotter
Så förlåt lilla vän
Siluetter Papirsklip
Äntligen är vi tillsammans
Flyg fri
Ole Lukkeøye
Himlen den får vänta än
Störst av allt är kärleken
Som en sommarvind

Charts

References 

1985 albums
Vikingarna (band) albums
Swedish-language albums